Idalus erythronota is a moth of the family Erebidae. It was described by Gottlieb August Wilhelm Herrich-Schäffer in 1853. It is found in Venezuela.

References

 

erythronota
Moths described in 1853